Ali Mohammed Bazmandegan (born 10 March 1993) is a Qatari footballer. He currently plays for Umm Salal.

External links

References

1993 births
Living people
Qatari footballers
Qatari people of Iranian descent
Al-Gharafa SC players
Lekhwiya SC players
Umm Salal SC players
Al-Arabi SC (Qatar) players
Naturalised citizens of Qatar
Qatar Stars League players
Qatar youth international footballers
Place of birth missing (living people)
Sportspeople of Iranian descent
Association football defenders